John MacVicar (July 4, 1859 – November 15, 1928) was an American politician who served as mayor of Des Moines, Iowa from 1896 to 1900 and from 1916 to 1918 and again in 1928 until his death.

Early life 
MacVicar was born on July 4, 1859, in Galt, Ontario, Canada to Mary ( McEwan) and John MacVicar. Shortly after with his family he moved to Guelph, Ontario and when he was nine years old they moved to Erie, Pennsylvania where he attended public schools until he was thirteen years old. After his mother's death he went to work selling newspapers and attended night school. in 1882 MacVicar moved to Des Moines, Iowa and in 1884 he was married to Nettie Nash.

Career 
In 1888 MacVicar was elected town recorder of North Des Moines and a year later was elected mayor. North Des Moines was annexed to Des Moines in 1890.
In 1892 he participated in a campaign against the high rates charged by the Des Moines Water Works Company.
In 1896 he was elected mayor of Des Moines and was reelected in 1898, in the 1900 election he was defeated by Jeremiah J. Hartenbower. In 1908 MacVicar was elected to the Des Moines City Commission and served from 1908 to 1912.
He was again elected mayor, in 1916 and 1928.

Death 
MacVicar died on November 15, 1928, at his home in Des Moines

References 

1859 births
1928 deaths
Iowa Republicans
Mayors of Des Moines, Iowa